The most popular cookie in the United States, based on sales, is the Oreo. The Oreo is made by Nabisco, a division of Mondelez International.

In addition to their traditional design of two chocolate wafers separated by a vanilla creme filling, Oreo cookies have been produced in many different varieties since they were first introduced.  This list is merely a guide to some of the more notable and recent types; not all are available in every country.

Other types
 Double Stuf Oreo (introduced in 1974) have about twice the normal amount of white creme filling. Available in original, peanut butter, golden, heads or tails, cool mint, chocolate creme, as well as an original gluten free version. In the UK they are called Double Creme Oreo and are currently only available in original.
 Football Oreo, football-shaped Oreo cookies, introduced in 1976. For a limited time, they introduced 5 new designs.
 Big Stuf Oreo (introduced in 1987), were several times the size of a normal Oreo. Sold individually, each Big Stuf contained  and 13 grams of fat. They were discontinued in 1991.
 Mini Oreo, originally released in 1991, are bite-sized versions of ordinary Oreo cookies. After being discontinued in the late 1990s they were re-released in 2000 along with the redesigned 2001 Dodge Caravan as part of a promotional tie-in with DaimlerChrysler. Their 1990s packaging consisted of a "miniaturized" version of the full-size cardboard tray and box used in packaging at the time. Their current packaging consists of a plastic, foil-lined bag. Mini Oreos are available in original, golden, mint, and Reese's varieties, as well as in Nabisco To-Go Cups, lidded plastic cups which fit into car cup-holders. In 2015, a new flavor of the mini Oreo, mint, debuted.

 NBA Dynasty Oreo, released in March 2021, are regular chocolate Oreo cookies with NBA team logos (such as the Golden State Warriors, Boston Celtics and Miami Heat) printed on them.
 Triple Double Oreo, for sale in the US in summer 2011, combine three wafers with two layers of creme, one vanilla, and one chocolate.
 Triple Double Neapolitan Oreo, similar to the original triple double Oreo cookies, but are three vanilla Oreo cookies, with chocolate filling between the first and second cookies, and strawberry filling between the second and third.
 Triple Double Chocolate Mint Oreo were limited edition cookies with chocolate and mint creme.
 100 Calorie Pack Oreo (Oreo Thinsations in Canada) are miniature, thin, hexagonal versions of Oreo with no creme-filling, and come individually portioned into  pouches.
 Mega Stuf Oreo, introduced in February 2013, are similar to Double Stuf Oreo cookies, but with even more white creme filling. They come in chocolate, golden and heads or tails varieties.
 Oreo Thins, released in 2015, are thin versions of these cookies. They come in the following varieties: chocolate, dark chocolate, golden, mint, lemon, coconut, salted caramel, pistachio, pina colada, and latte. They have 40 calories per cookie. At 10.1 ounces, the package is lighter than the normal 14.3 ounce package, at same cost.
 Oreo Thins Extra Stuf, released in January 2022, these snacks combine the cookie structure of an Oreo thin (for a lighter, crispier crunch) and comparably more creme filling than the original Oreo (but less than that of the Double Stuf).
 The Most Stuf, a limited edition Oreo introduced in 2019 with approximately four times the filling of a standard Oreo.
 Gluten Free Oreo, introduced in January 2021, comes in both traditional and Double Stuf varieties
 Oreo x The Batman, released in early 2022 to coincide with the film, are limited edition cookies with Batman's head stamped on them.
 The Most Oreo Oreo, introduced in January 2023, contains chocolate cookies with Most Stuf cookies and cream filling. They are similar to the original sized cookies and cream Oreos that were made in 2015.

Other flavors

 Android Oreo, special cross promotional Oreo cookie with the Google Android logo on one side and "green" flavoring.
 Chocolate Creme Oreo cookies, introduced in United States,  Indonesia, Malaysia, Philippines, China, South Korea, Thailand, Singapore and Chile, Launched year 2001.
 Coconut Delight Oreo cookies, introduced in Indonesia. As its name implies, they are an Oreo cookie with coconut crème filling.
 Strawberry Milkshake Oreo cookies, introduced in Canada, and sold for a limited time in the United States, is an Oreo cookie with strawberry flavoring.
Strawberry Creme Oreo cookies, introduced in Indonesia, Malaysia, Philippines, South Korea, Singapore and Chile, Launched year 2001.
 Strawberry Cheesecake Oreo
 Green Tea Oreo cookies, introduced in China and Japan.
 Lemon Ice Oreo cookies, introduced in Japan.
 Organic Oreo cookies, introduced in 2006, are plain Oreo cookies made with organic flour and organic sugar.
 Blueberry Ice Cream Oreo cookies, introduced in Singapore, Indonesia, and Malaysia in 2010. Also sold in Thailand and China.
 Orange Ice Cream Oreo cookies, introduced in Indonesia, Malaysia, Singapore and Thailand in 2011.

 Golden Oreo cookies, introduced in Indonesia in 2011. They are Oreo's chocolate cookies replaced by milk-flavored cookies
Double Stuf Golden Oreo cookies, introduced in late August 2009. As the name indicates, they are Double Stuf Oreo cookies with Golden Oreo biscuits instead of normal chocolate Oreo biscuits.
 Golden Oreo cookie series have vanilla biscuits with other fillings such as vanilla and chocolate, known as Uh-Oh Oreo until its re-branding in 2007. Introduced in Indonesia in 2011 with cookies and creme.
 Chocolate Creme Golden Oreo cookies, introduced in 2012, are original golden Oreos with the addition of chocolate creme, becoming an inverted color scheme of the original Oreos.
 Oreo Heads or Tails cookies have vanilla creme filling with a chocolate Oreo wafer on one side and a Golden Oreo wafer on the other, they only come in double stuf and mega stuf versions.
 Creamsicle Oreo cookies have vanilla and orange creme filling with vanilla Oreo wafers.
 Ice Cream Oreo Rainbow Shure Bert cookies have rainbow sherbet filling with vanilla Oreo wafers.
 Oreo DQ Blizzard Creme cookies, were a limited edition Oreo released in April–May 2010. It celebrated the 25th anniversary of the Dairy Queen Blizzard.

 Double Delight Oreo cookies, introduced in 1987, have chocolate cookies with two fillings, notably peanut butter and chocolate, mint and creme, and coffee and creme flavors.
 There are also ongoing fruit series: orange and mango, raspberry and blueberry, grape and peach in China.
 Cool Mint Creme Oreo cookies are a Double Stuf Oreo with a mildly minty creme filling.
 Peanut Butter Oreo cookies are a Double Stuf Oreo with a peanut butter creme filling.
 Pure Milk Chocolate Covered Mint Oreo cookies are similar to Milk Chocolate Oreo but have a mint-flavored filling.
 Banana Split Creme Oreo cookies with a light yellow banana-flavor filling, were available for a limited time in 2008.
 Brownie Batter Oreo cookies introduced in August 2015, are two chocolate cookies with brownie batter flavored creme filling.
Sugar Free Oreo cookies, introduced in 2006, cost over twice as much as regular Oreo cookies, and had only trace amounts of sugar, 10 fewer calories per serving, 0.5 grams more fat and 450% more fiber.
Reduced Fat Oreo cookies, introduced in 2006, cost the same as regular Oreo cookies, had as much sugar, 10 fewer calories per serving, about 35% less fat and the same amount of fiber.
 During springtime, around Halloween and Christmastime, special edition "Double Stuf Oreo" cookies are produced with colored frosting reflecting the current holiday (blue or yellow, orange, and red or green respectively). One side of each seasonal cookie is also stamped with an appropriate design: spring cookies feature flowers, butterflies, etc., and the Halloween Oreos bear a jack o'lantern, ghost, cat, flock of bats, and/or broom-riding witch.
 Chocolate and Dulce de leche Oreo, sold in Argentina, has chocolate or Dulce de Leche instead of the usual creme.
 Oreo cookies with red-colored creme, were introduced in 2010, as a promotion for the How To Train Your Dragon movie release.
 Berry Burst Ice Cream Oreo cookies were a limited-edition release in April 2011. They were described as tasting very similar to the Strawberry Milkshake Oreos made in 2008.
  cookies were a limited-edition release in February–July 2012 to celebrate Oreo's 100th birthday. They were made of two chocolate Oreo cookies with a birthday-cake flavored filling with sprinkles. This edition replaced the traditional Oreo logo on one side with a birthday candle and the words "OREO 100". The flavor has since been reintroduced, with "double stuf" creme filling in both chocolate and golden Oreo varieties, but the cookies no longer display the "OREO 100" print.
 Birthday Cake Oreo - Fudge Dipped Vanilla were a limited-edition release in February–July 2012 to celebrate Oreo's 100th birthday. They were made of one vanilla Oreo cookie coated in fudge with a birthday cake flavored filling and sprinkles inside.
 Candy Cane Oreo cookies were first released for the holidays in 2012, later returning as Peppermint Oreo in the years following.

 Candy Corn Oreo cookies were a limited edition Halloween-related flavor released in 2012 and 2013. They made another return in 2016 at Target stores only. They were made of two golden Oreo cookies with half yellow and half orange creme filling.
 Gingerbread Oreo cookies were a limited edition release made of two golden Oreo cookies with a mild gingerbread-flavored filling.
 The American Creme were a limited edition release in 2012 made of two golden Oreo cookies with red-and-blue colored creme. Another version, called “Team USA”, were released in summer 2020 for the Olympics, despite the event being postponed until 2021. These consisted of red, white, and blue colored creme layered one on top of the other, and contained about as much creme as Double Stuf Oreos.
 Berry Oreo cookies were made of chocolate Oreo cookies with berry-flavored filling.
 Lemon Twist Oreo cookies were a limited edition release in 2012 that returned in 2013, made of two golden Oreo cookies with a lemon flavored filling.
 Triple Double Neapolitan Oreo cookies were a limited edition release in 2012 made of three golden Oreo cookies formed as a double sandwich of chocolate-and-strawberry creme fillings. They made a return in June 2022, but instead of the triple double version, it consists of two waffle cone-flavored cookies with three creme fillings in the middle: vanilla, chocolate and strawberry.
 Prime Berry Creme Oreo cookies were released on June 27, 2013, in Manila, Philippines. They were made of two Oreo cookies with blueberry Ice-Cream-flavored filling. They were inspired by the movie Transformers: Age of Extinction
 Ice Cream Rainbow Shure, Bert! Oreo cookies were a limited edition release in 2013, made of two golden Oreo cookies with a double stuf-thick layer of tri-color raspberry and lime sherbet flavor creme filling.
 Watermelon Oreo cookies were a limited edition release for the summer of 2013, made of two golden Oreo cookies with watermelon-flavoured filling.
 Strawberries n' Creme cookies were a limited edition release in 2013, made of two golden Oreo cookies with a creme of one half strawberry-flavored and one half similar to traditional oreo creme flavor.
 Banana Split Oreo cookies were a limited edition release in fall 2013, featuring a Double Stuf cookie of one golden and one chocolate Oreo, strawberry-and-banana flavored creme filling.
 Limeade Oreo cookies released in 2014, are two vanilla cookies with a lime-flavored creme filling.
 SpongeBob Oreo cookies were a limited edition release in 2014 featuring chocolate cookies with yellow creme and each cookie having a SpongeBob SquarePants character stamped on it.
 Fruit Punch Oreo cookies were a limited edition release in 2014, made of vanilla cookies with fruit-punch flavored creme.
 Cookie Dough Oreo cookies were a limited edition release in March 2014, made of chocolate cookies with cookie dough flavored creme.
 Caramel Apple Oreo cookies were a limited edition release in August 2014 exclusively at Target stores, made of vanilla cookies with caramel apple flavored creme.
Pumpkin Spice Oreo cookies, a limited edition release in September 2014 that returned in August 2022, are made of Golden Oreo cookies with pumpkin spice flavored filling.
Red Velvet Oreo cookies were a limited edition release in February 2015, made of red Oreo cookies with creme-cheese-flavored filling. They are now a permanent flavor and can easily be found in most grocery stores in the US.
 Reese's Peanut Butter Cup Oreo cookies were introduced in May 2014, similar to Peanut Butter Oreos, but with half peanut butter and half chocolate filling.
 Cotton Candy Oreo cookies were a limited edition release in April 2015 exclusively at Target stores, made of two golden Oreo cookies with cotton candy flavored pink-and-blue creme filling.
 S'Mores Oreo cookies were a limited edition release in May 2015, made of two graham-flavored Oreo cookies filled with both chocolate- and marshmallow-flavored creme.
  Root Beer Float Oreo cookies were a limited edition release in July 2014, made of two gold Oreo Cookies filled with rootbeer-flavored creme.
 Key Lime Pie Oreo were a limited edition release in July 2015, made of two graham-flavored Oreo cookies filled with key-lime-flavored creme.
 Marshmallow Crispy Oreo were a limited edition release in March 2014, made of two gold Oreo Cookies with marshmallow-flavored creme filling and rice crispies.
 Cookies & Creme Oreo cookies were a limited edition release in July 2015, made of chocolate Oreo cookies with cookies & creme ice cream flavored filling.
 Toasted Coconut Oreo were a limited edition release in September 2015, made of vanilla cookies with toasted coconut-flavored creme and flakes of toasted coconut.
 Oreo Soft Cookies, introduced in Japan, are soft cookies with various flavors like chestnut, Matcha green tea, lemon cheesecake, Blueberry cheesecake, and vanilla.
 Oreo Thins cookies released in 2015, are thin versions of Oreo cookies. They come in original, golden, mint, chocolate creme, lemon, coconut, salted caramel, tiramisu, latté and pistachio flavors.
 Cinnamon Bun Oreos cookies released January 2016, are made of cinnamon cookies with frosting-flavored creme.
 Filled Cupcake Oreos cookies were a limited edition release on February 8, 2016, made of chocolate cookies with a ring of chocolate creme and a dollop of vanilla creme in the center, similar to the Hostess CupCake.
 Fruity Crisps Oreo cookies were a limited edition release in June 2016, made of vanilla cookies with a creme interspersed with fruit-flavored "colorful rice crisps" similar to Fruity Pebbles (but without the Post brand name.)
 Blueberry Pie Oreo cookies were a limited edition release June 2016, made of vanilla cookies with "Blueberry Pie" flavored creme. Originally distributed exclusively through Target.
 Chocolate Strawberry Oreo cookies were spotted in December 2016, with "chocolate creme that surrounds a strawberry center."
 Swedish Fish Oreo cookies released in August 2016 combined chocolate cookies with creme flavored to resemble the red-colored Swedish Fish candy. Originally released exclusively through Kroger stores.

 Peeps Oreo cookies were a limited edition release in February 2017, made of two vanilla cookies filled with "Marshmallow Peeps flavored creme"
 Firework Oreo cookies were a limited edition release in May 2017. They were like the original Oreo, but with bits of red and blue popping candy throughout the filling.
 Mississippi Mud Pie Oreo cookies were a limited edition release in May 2017, made of a mix of Oreo's chocolate creme filling with a lighter whipped creme. Exclusive to Dollar General stores.
 Jelly Donut Oreo cookies were a limited edition release in May 2017, made of golden Oreo cookies with a ring of vanilla creme and a dollop of jelly-flavored creme in the center.
 Waffles & Syrup Oreo cookies were a limited edition release in May 2017, made of golden Oreo cookies with a ring of vanilla creme and a dollop of maple-flavored creme in the center.
 Dunkin' Donuts Mocha Oreo cookies were a limited edition release in July 2017, made of chocolate Oreo cookies and mocha-flavored creme filling.
 PB&J Oreo cookies were a limited edition release in August 2017, made of golden Oreo cookies with both peanut-butter-flavored creme and jelly-flavored creme.
 Cookie Butter Oreo cookies were released in September 2017, made of graham-flavored Oreo cookies with cookie butter-flavored creme.
 Apple Pie Oreo cookies were released in September 2017, made of graham-flavored Oreo cookies with apple-pie-flavored creme.
 Mystery Oreo, were a limited edition release in October 2017, contains a chocolate cookie with a mystery flavor filling. Oreo hosted a contest to guess the flavor until December 2017. Fruity Pebbles was confirmed as the mystery flavor.
Dark and White Chocolate Oreo, released in October 2017, are made of chocolate cookies with two fillings: dark and white chocolate with vanilla flavor.
Chocolate Hazelnut Oreo, Spicy Hot Cinnamon Oreo and Hot Cocoa Oreo are three different cookie flavors that were all released in January 2018.
 Peeps Oreo cookies were a limited edition release in February 2018, made of two chocolate cookies filled with "Marshmallow Peeps flavored creme."
Cherry Cola Oreo, Kettle Corn Oreo, and Pina Colada Oreo thins were released in April 2018 as part of the "My Oreo Creation" campaign.
Good Humor Strawberry Shortcake Oreo cookies were a limited edition release July 2018, made of golden cookies with strawberry shortcake filling.
Chocolate Peanut Butter Pie Oreo were a limited edition release in June 2018, made of golden-outer cookies with chocolate & peanut butter creme filling. They are currently still available as a permanent flavor.
Rocky Road Trip Oreo cookies were a limited edition release in July 2018, made of chocolate Oreos with rocky road-flavored creme filling and marshmallow bits.
Peppermint Bark Oreo cookies were a limited edition release in October 2018, made of peppermint-flavored creme willing and "crunchy sugar crystals."
Mickey Mouse Oreo cookies were a limited edition release in September 2018, celebrating Mickey Mouse's 90 Year Anniversary with birthday cake flavored creme filling.
Hot Chicken Wing Oreo & Wasabi Oreo cookies were released in August 2018 in China made of hot wing and Wasabi flavored creme filling, respectively.
Choc'o Brownie Oreo cookies were released in September 2018 made with chocolate brownie creme filling.
Crispy Tiramisu Oreo cookies were introduced in Japan in December 2017.
Dark Chocolate Oreo cookies were released in January 2019, made of Oreo cookies with dark chocolate with cocoa creme filling.
Love Oreo cookies were a limited edition release in January 2019, celebrating Valentine's Day. They were with a "sweet and tangy" pink flavored creme filling.
Carrot Cake Oreo cookies were released in January 2019.
Game of Thrones Oreo were a limited edition release in April 2019, to commemorate the 8th season of Game of Thrones. They contain the same filling as regular Oreos with Game of Thrones characters on the sides.
Marshmallow Moon Oreo cookies were a limited edition release in June 2019, celebrating the 50th Anniversary of the first man on the moon. They have a dark grey filling meant to replicate the color of the moon and have a rocket on one side of the cookie with a spaceman on the other side.
Mint Chocolate Chip Oreo cookies were a limited edition release in July 2019, and were made with Baskin Robbins.
Mystery Oreo, were a limited edition release from September to November 2019, made of a chocolate cookie with a mystery flavor filling. Oreo hosted a contest with a $50,000 grand prize to guess the flavor. Churros was confirmed to be the mystery flavor.
Supreme Oreos, a special cross promotion cookie that consist of red wafers and original creme filling with the Supreme logo stamped on it, were released online in March 2020.
Caramel Coconut Oreo and Chocolate Marshmallow Oreo, which contains caramel creme mixed with toasted coconut pieces, and marshmallow creme, respectively. Both were released in January 2020.
Double Oreo Chiara Ferragni, a special edition launched in Italy in March 2020 with a themed packaging.
Lady Gaga Oreos (also referred to as Chromatica Oreos), released in the US as part of a promotion with the pop singer. The cookie consists of a pink cookie with a green creme and follows the same flavor palate as the standard ‘Golden’ Oreo. Other markets, such as the UK, Spain and Italy received regular vanilla Oreos in Chromatica themed packaging.
Peanut Butter and Chocolate Oreo
Brookie-O Brownie Oreo, released in January 2021, contains chocolate cookies with three creme fillings: brownie, vanilla and cookie dough.
Java Chip Oreo, also released in January 2021, consists of chocolate cookies with coffee-flavored creme mixed with chocolate chip pieces.
Rainbow Oreo
Salted Caramel Brownie Oreo, released in July 2021, consists of chocolate cookies (topped with salt) with two layers of salted caramel brownie-flavored creme filling.
Apple Cider Donut Oreo, released in August 2021, consists of golden cookies with apple cider-flavored creme filling.
Pokémon x Oreo, a special cross promotion with Pokémon featuring sixteen different characters stamped on the cookies. Released in September 2021.
Ultimate Chocolate Oreo and Toffee Crunch Oreo, both released in January 2022, consist of dark chocolate and toffee creme respectively.
Easter Egg Oreo, introduced in 2019, features two Oreo cookies in an oval shape to resemble eggs.
Mocha Caramel Latte Oreo, which consist of mocha latte and caramel creme, were released in April 2022 after being announced the previous month.
Oreo Twists Vanilla & Raspberry and Oreo Twists Vanilla & Caramel, released in the UK in May 2022, are regular chocolate Oreos that consist of vanilla and raspberry creme and vanilla and caramel creme, respectively. They are only available in Asda stores in the UK.
Snickerdoodle Oreo, a limited edition flavor released in October 2022, consists of snickerdoodle-flavored wafers with cinnamon creme filling and red and green sugar crystals.

Beyond sandwich cookies

  Norwegian Freia milk chocolate with Oreo bites 
  Oreo Brownie, a chocolate brownie that contains Oreo cookie pieces and is often topped with extra Oreos and/or frosting. 
 Fudge Covered Oreo, White Fudge Oreo, Mint Fudge Oreo, and Milk Chocolate Oreo are covered in either a layer of fudge, white fudge, mint fudge, or milk chocolate respectively. The Mint Fudge variety is nearly identical to Mystic Mints, produced by Nabisco from the 1970s through the 1990s. In the US, the white fudge variety is marketed as seasonal and is only broadly available the Thanksgiving-Christmas holiday period.
 Oreo Fudge Cremes are a single cookie (not a sandwich), with creme, covered in fudge, in various flavors.
 Oreo Fudgees are rectangular "dipping" shaped Oreo cookies with a chocolate fudge filling (different from the Chocolate Creme Oreo).
 Oreo Fudge Sundae Creme, a limited edition introduced in 2009, are chocolate ring cookies with traditional white creme filling on half a ring cookie, and fudge creme on the other half.
 Oreo Fudge Rings are chocolate ring cookies with the traditional white creme filling drizzled over them.

 Oreo Cakesters: Introduced in 2007, Oreo Cakesters are Oreo's version of a whoopie pie, soft chocolate snack cakes with vanilla, chocolate or peanut butter creme in the middle. They were discontinued in 2012. In 2021, a TikTok creator named Stefan Jonson started a movement to have them brought back. The same year, Nabisco announced that Cakesters would be making a return in 2022, including Oreo and Nutter Butter varieties.
 Oreo Wafer are long wafer sticks layered on top of each other with creme filling in the middle. Sold in Asia.
 Oreo WaferStix are long wafer sticks with a creme filling and covered by chocolate.
 Oreo Handi-Snacks are plastic holders with rectangular Oreo cookies and a little box of icing.
 Oreo Sippers were Oreo flavored sticks that could be eaten or used as a straw; it was discontinued in 2012.
 Oreo Star sold only in Asian Countries
 Oreo Soft Cake are chocolate sponge cake bars with a thin creme filling in the center, replicating an Oreo cookie in cake form. Sold in Indonesia.
 Creme Filled Oreo Brownie is a brownie with Oreo Creme Filling inside. First released in 2013.
 Jell-O Oreo Pudding – Jell-O brand chocolate pudding at the bottom and on top, with vanilla in the middle.
 Jell-O Oreo Instant Pudding – also named Cookies n' Creme. The box contains instant vanilla pudding with real cookie pieces.
 In 1997, Post introduced Oreo O's, a cereal consisting of chocolatey O-shaped pieces with a hint of Oreo flavor. It was discontinued in 2007 but reintroduced in 2017.
 Golden Oreo O's were introduced in 2018 and first sold at Walmart. In 2019, Post introduced Mega Stuf Oreo O's, which are similar to the chocolate version, but with marshmallows, similar to the previously discontinued Extreme Creme Taste Oreo O's. This cereal was also sold at Walmart.
 Oreo Ice Cream. Licensed by Breyers, Good Humor, and Klondike in the US, and Nestlé in Canada. Flavors are:
 Oreo Ice Cream (blended Oreo cookies in vanilla ice cream)
 Oreo Ice Cream Sandwich (extra large Oreo wafers with vanilla ice cream in the middle)
 Oreo Ice Cream Bar (vanilla light ice cream mixed with Oreo pieces with a chocolate flavored coating with Oreo bits)
 Mint Oreo Ice Cream (blended Oreo cookies in mint ice cream)
 Chocolate Oreo Ice Cream (blended Oreo cookies in chocolate ice cream)
 2 in 1 Oreo and Chips Ahoy! Ice Cream (blended Oreo and Chips Ahoy! cookie pieces in vanilla and sweet cream ice cream, respectively)
 Many notable fast-food restaurants, such as Dairy Queen and Baskin Robbins, serve Oreo-flavored ice cream desserts and milkshakes
 Oreo Ice Cream is also called Cookies and Creme.
 Easy-Bake Oreo Mix – two easy-bake chocolate cakes with a marshmallow filling topped with an Oreo cookie topping
 Oreo Holiday Treats – Oreo cookies covered in dark chocolate
 Oreo Chocolate Candy Bar - A chocolate candy bar with a rectangular Oreo cookie and Oreo creme filling covered in milk chocolate.
 Oreo Pie Crust, a pie crust made of crushed Oreo cookies, sold around the U.S.
 Banana Split Oreo, introduced in Canada, an Oreo cookie with banana flavoring.
 Oreo Milkshake is a Kraft Foods recipe consisting of Oreo cookies, milk, vanilla ice-cream and chocolate syrup.
 Oreo Cookie Cheesecake, manufactured by The Cheesecake Factory

 Cadbury Dairy Milk 'with Oreo' - Cadbury milk chocolate with an Oreo filling. Also comes in Peanut Butter flavor.
 Milka 'Milka & Oreo' - Milka milk chocolate with an Oreo filling. Also comes in Mint flavor.
 Tim Hortons Canadian-based coffee chain released an 'Oreo' donut - chocolate donut with Vanilla Creme Filling, White Fondant frosting and Oreo cookie crumb topping.
 Oreo mini bars, Japanese, in various flavors, e.g. orange chocolate, bitter chocolate, green tea chocolate, Amaou strawberry, macadamia nut.
 Oreo Doughnut (UK)
 Oreo 'alfajor' (sold only in Argentina and Uruguay)
 Nestlé Oreo Ice Cream (Chocolate & Vanilla Flavors)
 Joy Fill Oreos were released on August 2, 2018. (Regular, Caramel.)
 State Fair Oreo Cookies were released on August 2–3, 2018. (Vanilla Crunch, Chocolate Crunch.)
 Oreo Music Box is a strange "Record Player" that plays music when you put an Oreo in it, and the music changes when you take a bite out of it. Released on November 19, 2018.

References

Further reading

External links 

Oreo
Oreo